Far Eastern Air Transport Flight 104 was a short-haul flight from Kaohsiung International Airport to Taipei Songshan Airport, Taiwan using a Handley Page Dart Herald aircraft that crashed on 24 February 1969 upon its approach for an emergency landing in Tainan Airport in Taiwan.

Aircraft 

Aircraft model: Handley Page Dart Herald

 Manufacturing serial number (msn): 157
 Registration: B-2009

Accident 
On February 24, 1969, the B-2009 aircraft carried out the FE104 flight that ended the Spring Festival holiday and flew from Kaohsiung International Airport to Taipei Songshan Airport. The flight took off at 12:03 pm, after a 13-minute delay from 11:50 am. Ten minutes after take-off, the captain told the Tainan Airport Tower that an engine failure had occurred. The aircraft's port-side engine had failed, leaving its propeller windmilling and the aircraft in a shallow descent. The flight crew decided to divert to Tainan Airport in Tainan City. Moments after receiving clearance for an emergency landing, however, the aircraft passed over a wooded area, belly-landed in a small clearing and skidded into a creek. The aircraft broke into three parts and caught fire, killing all on board.

Cause 
The right engine had been severely damaged, causing the aircraft to quickly lose altitude.

References
http://aviation-safety.net/database/record.php?id=19690224-0
http://www.planecrashinfo.com/1969/1969-14.htm

Aviation accidents and incidents in 1969
Airliner accidents and incidents caused by mechanical failure
Aviation accidents and incidents in Taiwan
Accidents and incidents involving the Handley Page Dart Herald
Far Eastern Air Transport accidents and incidents
1969 in Taiwan
February 1969 events in Asia
History of Tainan
1969 disasters in Taiwan